Duncannon is a village in southwest County Wexford, Ireland. Bordered to the west by Waterford harbour and sitting on a rocky headland jutting into the channel is the strategically prominent Duncannon Fort which dominates the village.

Primarily a fishing village, Duncannon also relies heavily on tourism and is situated on the clearly signposted and very scenic Ring of Hook drive. Duncannon beach, a mile long golden beach, was once a blue flag recipient.

Duncannon Fort, which was built in 1588, incorporates a maritime museum, Cockleshell Arts Gallery, Officer's Mess Café and Craft shop and various other Art and Craft outlets and is open daily to visitors seven days from June to September. During the off season guided tours are available from Monday to Friday.  Duncannon Fort was the location for the opening scenes of the 2002 remake of 'The Count of Monte Cristo', starring Jim Caviezel and Richard Harris.

After being closed for some time, Duncannon Fort reopened to the public in 2016 when guided tours recommenced.

History
According to legend, the settlement at Duncannon dates back to the time of Fionn mac Cumhaill (pop: Finn McCool) and the Fianna in the 3rd century AD.

Duncannon was of vital strategic importance as its fort commanded the bay giving sea access to Waterford harbour. As a result, it was centrally involved in wars and sieges during the 17th and 18th centuries.

During the Irish Confederate Wars (1641–1652), the fort at Duncannon was initially occupied by English soldiers and used as a base for an attack on nearby Redmond's Hall (now Loftus Hall). During this period it was besieged three times. In 1645, it was taken by an Irish Confederate army under general Thomas Preston. Its English garrison surrendered after lengthy bombardment, during which their second in command Larcan was killed, and a ship, The Great Lewis, trying to bring supplies to the garrison was sunk with the loss of 200 lives (see Siege of Duncannon). During the Cromwellian conquest of Ireland, Duncannon was besieged again, as part of the Siege of Waterford, firstly in November 1649 by Oliver Cromwell and Michael Jones in 1649. The fort's Irish garrison held out, and the siege was abandoned in December of that year. However, in July 1650, Henry Ireton renewed the siege, and the fort and town surrendered after the fall of Waterford, but before their food and supplies had run out.

In 1659 and 1660, Duncannon was the only town to remain openly loyal to Edmund Ludlow after forces loyal to General George Monck took control of Dublin and other towns.

In the Williamite war in Ireland (1689–1691) James II, after his defeat at the battle of the Boyne, embarked at Duncannon for Kinsale and then to exile in France. Later his son in law and enemy William of Orange, marched on its cobblestones as the town and fort surrendered to his army without resistance.

The fort at Duncannon was one of the few places in county Wexford that did not fall to the rebels during the 1798 rebellion though a force sent out from the fort to defend Wexford town was defeated at the battle of Three Rocks. The fort and town then became a sanctuary for fleeing loyalists and troops in south Wexford and was also used as a prison and place of execution for suspected rebels.

Duncannon's strategic importance continued to be recognised throughout the 19th century. Napoleon sought and got intelligence on its strength and weakness, in preparation for a possible invasion of Ireland.

Duncannon fort was used by the FCA (Irish army reserve) as a barracks and training facility until recent years.

Transport
Bus Éireann route 370 links Duncannon to New Ross, Waterford and Wellingtonbridge. There are several buses daily except Sundays. The nearest railway station is Waterford railway station which is located 22km away in Waterford travelling via the Ballyhack - Passage East ferry.

Sports
The local Gaelic Athletic Association club team is called St James' G.A.A club, and plays in the Wexford Senior Football Championship and the Wexford Intermediate Hurling Championship. The club won the Wexford Senior Football Championship in 2015, having been promoted from the Intermediate rank the previous year. The hurling team have won several county titles having begun at Junior D level in 2009. In recent years Matthew O'Hanlon has captained the Wexford Senior Hurling team to win the Leinster SHC final in 2019 and village native Graeme Molloy has also captained the Wexford senior football side prior to his retirement. Brendan Doyle was also a pivotal member of the panel during the 2000s and early 2010s.

The local soccer team is Duncannon United who play in the Wexford League.

Local Business and Services
Duncannon is currently host to three pubs, two cafes and a local shop is due to be finished reconstruction during April 2022. Local restaurants include Aldridge Lodge and Dunbrody Country House, There are also cafe including the Wild Rose Cafe at the Fort Conan Hotel and Gralinn on the beach front. Duncannon Holiday Park is a holiday village which provides accommodation and camping facilities.

Events
There are three festivals of note held in Duncannon every year. In August there are two festivals. Firstly a Sand Festival is held on the beach. This includes a Sand Sculpting exhibition in a large tent on the beach and many other events including crab fishing competitions and one of the largest fireworks displays in Ireland to launch every festival, off of a boat near Duncannon beach. A Kitesurfing Festival  is also held every August, date dependent on tides.

Previously an annual Military and Vehicle Re-Enactment was held on the June Bank Holiday week-end. However this has been discontinued.

See also
 List of towns and villages in Ireland

References

 Philip McKeiver, "A New History of Cromwell's Irish Campaign", Advance Press, Manchester 2007,

External links

 Parish of Duncannon
 Official Catholic Parish Website

1640s in Ireland
Irish Confederate Wars
Towns and villages in County Wexford
Beaches of County Wexford